Joshua Kaindoh (born December 27, 1998) is an American football defensive end for the Kansas City Chiefs of the National Football League (NFL). He played college football at Florida State and was drafted by the Chiefs in the fourth round of the 2021 NFL Draft.

Professional career

Kaindoh was drafted by the Kansas City Chiefs in the fourth round, 144th overall, of the 2021 NFL Draft. He signed his four-year rookie contract on May 13, 2021. He was placed on injured reserve on October 5, 2021. He was activated on January 12, 2022. Kaindoh won Super Bowl LVII when the Chiefs defeated the Philadelphia Eagles.

References

1998 births
Living people
Players of American football from Baltimore
American football defensive ends
Florida State Seminoles football players
Kansas City Chiefs players